The Fiat 24-32 HP was introduced by the Italian automobile manufacturer Fiat in 1901. The car was designed to allow coachbuilders to make various bodies to fit. It was offered with three different wheelbases, short, medium and long. 
 
It was equipped with a 4-cylinder engine:
 1st series with a 6371 cc engine -  32 hp
 2nd series in 1904 with a 6902 cc engine - 32 hp
 3rd series in 1905 with a 7363 cc engine - 32 hp

More than 400 were made in the Corso Dante plant in Turin.

The Fiat 24-32 HP featured some important technological innovations: it was the first sedan car to use a "Landaulet" body type and was the first car to have an accelerator pedal and a gearbox with four forward gears.

In 1902, Fiat introduced a racing version of the 24 HP, The 24 HP Corsa. This was the first car ever to be specially designed for racing rather than derived from a series production automobile. The Corsa had a full steel chassis rather than the wood chassis that dominated at the time, and a twin-engine block 7238 cc developing 40 hp. This car dominated its competitors from its first release into competition.

References 

24-32 HP
Cars introduced in 1903
1900s cars
Luxury vehicles
Veteran vehicles